John Duncan Bulkeley (19 August 1911 – 6 April 1996) was a vice admiral in the United States Navy and was one of its most decorated naval officers. Bulkeley received the Medal of Honor for actions in the Pacific Theater during World War II. He was also the PT boat skipper who evacuated General Douglas MacArthur from Corregidor in the Philippines and commanded at the Battle of La Ciotat.

Buckley's version of PT-boat heroics in defending the Philippines from Japanese invasion in 1941-1942 was the subject of the novel "They Were Expendable" by William Lindsay White in 1942, which was turned into a big screen epic three years later by director John Ford, They Were Expendable, starring John Wayne and Robert Montgomery playing a somewhat fictionalized Buckeley role.

The United States Navy named an Arleigh Burke-class guided missile destroyer after him: , commissioned in 2001.

Early life and career

Bulkeley was born in New York City and grew up on a farm in Hackettstown, New Jersey, where he graduated from Hackettstown High School. He was a 1933 graduate of the United States Naval Academy.

Military career
In December 1936, he was assigned to the United States Asiatic Fleet where he was appointed as engineering officer onboard  in China and witnessed the Japanese invasions of the Chinese cities of Shantou and Shanghai, and the USS Panay incident during the Second Sino-Japanese War.

World War II
At the dawn of World War II, Bulkeley was a lieutenant in command of Motor Torpedo Boat Squadron Three, a Philippines-based detachment of six motor torpedo boats. He hit his stride as a daring, resourceful and courageous leader. On arriving at Mindanao, MacArthur said, "You have taken me out of the jaws of death. I shall never forget it." Bulkeley earned many of his array of decorations while in command of that squadron and a subsequent one. He was evacuated to Australia by a B-17 in the final days of the campaign.

In September 1942, while back in the United States helping to raise War Bonds as a lieutenant commander, he met former Ambassador to Britain Joseph Kennedy at New York's Plaza Hotel, and shortly after was instrumental in recruiting Lieutenant John F. Kennedy into the Navy's Motor Torpedo Boat Training Center (MTBTC) at Mellville, Rhode Island.  Kennedy's heroic captaining of the PT-109 would help to launch his first campaign for Congress.

In 1944, he took part in the Normandy invasion. Bulkeley led torpedo boats and minesweepers in clearing the lanes to Utah Beach, keeping German E-boats from attacking the landing ships along the Mason Line, and picking up wounded sailors from the sinking minesweeper , destroyer escort , and destroyer .  As invasion operations wound down, he received command of his first large ship, the destroyer . In August, 1944, Bulkeley was appointed to take charge of an diversion raid against the port of La Ciotat, an action that led to the Battle of La Ciotat. The 2 British gunboats under his command came under accurate fire from a German corvette and armed yacht. Charging in with only one gun working, he engaged both enemy vessels at point-blank range, sinking both.  Afterwards, Bulkeley rescued the British sailors in the water and then rescued many of the German sailors as well.  Later, he said, "What else could I do? You engage, you fight, you win.  That is the reputation of our Navy, then and in the future."

Cold War
During the Korean War in 1952, Bulkeley commanded Destroyer Division 132.  After the war, he was Chief of Staff for Cruiser Division Five.

In the early 1960s, Bulkeley commanded Clarksville Base, Tennessee, then a tri-service command under the aegis of the Defense Atomic Support Agency.  Having lost none of his wartime daring, Bulkeley was known to test the alertness of the Marines guarding the base by donning a ninja suit, blackening his face and endeavoring to penetrate the classified area after dark without detection. This was a dangerous endeavor, as the Marines carried loaded weapons.  Ever popular with his men, who both respected and admired him, Bulkeley could be seen driving around the base in his fire-engine red Triumph TR3 sports car with a large silver PT boat as a hood ornament.

Promoted to rear admiral by President John F. Kennedy, who commanded PT-109 during World War II, Bulkeley was dispatched to command the Guantanamo Bay Naval Base in Cuba, where he met Cuba's threat to sever water supplies in response to the Bay of Pigs invasion and other assaults by ordering the installation of desalinization equipment to make the base self-sufficient.

Retirement and return to duty
Bulkeley retired from active duty in 1975. However, he was recalled to active duty in a retired-retained status in order to serve as the commander of the Navy's Board of Inspection and Survey (INSURV) which conducts inspections and surveys of U.S. naval vessels before their commissioning and deployment. Later promoted to Vice Admiral, Bulkeley retired from the Navy in 1988, after 55 years of service.

Personal life
On 6 April 1996, Bulkeley died at his home in Silver Spring, Maryland, at age 84. He was buried at Arlington National Cemetery, in Arlington, Virginia.

Awards and decorations
Bulkeley's awards and decorations include:

Medal of Honor citation

Bulkeley's Medal of Honor citation reads:
For extraordinary heroism, distinguished service, and conspicuous gallantry above and beyond the call of duty as commander of Motor Torpedo Boat Squadron 3, in Philippine waters during the period  1941 to  1942. The remarkable achievement of LCDR Bulkeley's command in damaging or destroying a notable number of Japanese enemy planes, surface combatant and merchant ships, and in dispersing landing parties and land-based enemy forces during the 4 months and 8 days of operation without benefit of repairs, overhaul, or maintenance facilities for his squadron, is believed to be without precedent in this type of warfare. His dynamic forcefulness and daring in offensive action, his brilliantly planned and skillfully executed attacks, supplemented by a unique resourcefulness and ingenuity, characterize him as an outstanding leader of men and a gallant and intrepid seaman. These qualities coupled with a complete disregard for his own personal safety reflect great credit upon him and the Naval Service.

Legacy
Route 57 in Mansfield Township, Warren County, New Jersey, is named the "Admiral John D. Bulkeley Memorial Highway" in his honor. In addition, the USN destroyer , commissioned in 2001, is named after him.

The headquarters building of Naval Station Guantanamo Bay is named Bulkeley Hall.  A quartering area for sailors at the naval station is named Camp Bulkeley.

In the media
Buckley's version of PT-boat heroics in defending the Philippines from Japanese invasion in 1941-1942 was the subject of the laudatory fictionalized novel "They Were Expendable" by William Lindsay White in 1942.

Three years later John Ford directed a film version of the book, They Were Expendable, starring John Wayne and Robert Montgomery, who portrayed motor torpedo boat squadron commander LT Brickley, based on Bulkeley's early experiences commanding Motor Torpedo Boat Squadron Three (MTBRON3) in the Philippines.  Montgomery, a veteran PT-boat commander, assisted Ford in the direction. Donna Reed and Ward Bond were also featured.

Bulkeley was depicted in the 1977 movie MacArthur by William Wellman Jr. during the evacuation of General MacArthur and his family from Corregidor.

See also

 List of Medal of Honor recipients
 List of Medal of Honor recipients for World War II

Notes

References
 
 
 
 
 
 Sea Wolf, A Biography of John D. Bulkeley, USN by William B. Breuer, published by Presidio Press, Novato, CA

External links

 
 

1911 births
1996 deaths
Hackettstown High School alumni
United States Navy personnel of World War II
United States Navy personnel of the Korean War
Burials at Arlington National Cemetery
United States Navy vice admirals
United States Navy Medal of Honor recipients
Recipients of the Navy Cross (United States)
Recipients of the Distinguished Conduct Star
Recipients of the Distinguished Service Cross (United States)
Recipients of the Silver Star
Recipients of the Legion of Merit
Recipients of the Croix de Guerre 1939–1945 (France)
Recipients of the Navy Distinguished Service Medal
Military personnel from New York City
People from Hackettstown, New Jersey
United States Army Air Forces officers
World War II recipients of the Medal of Honor
Military personnel from New Jersey